The term radiogenomics is used in two contexts: either to refer to the study of genetic variation associated with response to radiation (radiation genomics) or to refer to the correlation between cancer imaging features and gene expression (imaging genomics).

Radiation genomics

In radiation genomics, radiogenomics is used to refer to the study of genetic variation associated with response to radiation therapy. Genetic variation, such as single nucleotide polymorphisms, is studied in relation to a cancer patient's risk of developing toxicity following radiation therapy.    It is also used in the context of studying the genomics of tumor response to radiation therapy.

The term radiogenomics was coined more than eighteen years ago by Andreassen et al. (2002)  as an analogy to pharmacogenomics, which studies the genetic variation associated with drug responses. See also West et al. (2005)  and Bentzen (2006).

The Radiogenomics Consortium

In 2009, a Radiogenomics Consortium (RGC) was established to facilitate and promote multi-centre collaboration of researchers linking genetic variants with response to radiation therapy. The Radiogenomics Consortium (http://epi.grants.cancer.gov/radiogenomics/) is a Cancer Epidemiology Consortium supported by the Epidemiology and Genetics Research Program of the National Cancer Institute of the National Institutes of Health. RGC researchers have completed numerous clinical studies that identified genetic variants associated with radiation toxicities in patients with prostate, breast, lung, head and neck, and other cancers.

Imaging genomics 
Radiological images are used to diagnose disease on a large scale: tissue imaging correlates with tissue pathology.  The addition of genomic data including DNA microarrays, miRNA, RNA-Seq allows new correlations to be made between cellular genomics and tissue-scale imaging.

Practice and applications of imaging genomics

In imaging genomics, radiogenomics can be used to create imaging biomarkers that can identify the genomics of a disease, especially cancer without the use of a biopsy.  Various techniques for dealing with high-dimensional data are used to find statistically significant correlations between MRI, CT, and PET imaging features and the genomics of disease, including SAM, VAMPIRE, and GSEA.

The imaging radiogenomic approach has proven successful in determining the MRI phenotype associated genetics of glioblastoma, a highly aggressive type of brain tumor with low prognosis. The first large-scale MR-imaging microRNA-mRNA correlative study in GBM was published by Zinn et al. in 2011  Similar studies in liver cancer have successfully determined much of the liver cancer genome from non-invasive imaging features. Gevaert et al. at Stanford University have shown the potential to link image features of non-small cell lung nodules in CT scans to predict survival by leveraging publicly available gene expression data. This publication was accompanied by an editorial discussing the synergy between imaging and genomics. More recently, Mu Zhou et al.  at Stanford University have showed that multiple associations between semantic image features and metagenes that represented canonical molecular pathways, and it can result in noninvasive identification of molecular properties of non-small cell lung cancer.

Several radiogenomic studies have now been carried out in prostate cancer, Some have noted that genetic features correlated with MRI signal are often also associated with more aggressive prostate cancer. A systematic review of the genetic features found in more visible lesions on MRI identified multiple studies which had found loss of the tumour suppressor PTEN, increased gene expression linked to cell proliferation as well as cell-ECM interactions. This may indicate that certain genetic features drives cellular changes which ultimately effect fluid movement which can be seen on MRI and these features are predominantly associated with poor prognosis. The combination of more dangerous genetic alterations, histology and clinical outcomes for patients with prostate tumours which are visible on mpMRI, has led to suggestions that the definition of 'clinically significant cancer' should be at least in part based on mpMRI findings.

The radiogenomic approach has been also successfully applied in breast cancer. In 2014, Mazurowski et al. showed that enhancement dynamics in MRI, computed using computer vision algorithms, are associated with gene expression-based tumor molecular subtype in breast cancer patients.

Programs that study the connections between radiology and genomics are active at the University of Pennsylvania, UCLA, MD Anderson Cancer Center, Stanford University and at Baylor College of Medicine  in Houston, Texas.

See also

Pharmacogenomics
Radiation therapy
Radiosensitivity

References

Further reading 
https://epi.grants.cancer.gov/radiogenomics/

Radiology
Genomics